The Lodzova is a left tributary of the river Taița in Romania. It flows into the Taița near Horia.

References

Rivers of Romania
1Lodzova
Rivers of Tulcea County